Poland has historically been one of the most religious countries in Europe.  Though varied religious communities exist in Poland, most Poles adhere to Christianity. Within this, the largest grouping is the Roman Catholic Church: 91.9% of the population identified themselves with that denomination in 2018 and, according to the Institute for Catholic Church Statistics, 36.7% of Polish Catholic believers attended Sunday Mass in 2015. Poland has historically been one of the most Catholic countries in the world; Neal Pease describes Poland as "Rome's Most Faithful Daughter."

Roman Catholicism continues to be important in the lives of many Poles, and the Catholic Church in Poland enjoys social prestige and political influence. Its members regard it as a repository of Polish heritage and culture. Poland lays claim to having the highest proportion of Roman Catholic citizens of any country in Europe except Malta and San Marino (higher than in Italy, Spain, and Ireland, all countries in which the Roman Catholic Church has been the sole established religion).

The current extent of this numerical dominance results largely from The Holocaust of Jews living in Poland carried out by Nazi Germany and the World War II casualties among Polish religious minorities, as well as the flight and expulsion of Germans, many of whom were not Roman Catholics, at the end of World War II.

The rest of the population consists mainly of Eastern Orthodox (Polish Orthodox Church – approximately 507,196 believers), various Protestant churches (the largest of which is the Evangelical Church of the Augsburg Confession in Poland, with 61,217 members) and Jehovah's Witnesses (116,935). There are about 55,000 Greek Catholics in Poland. Other religions practiced in Poland, by less than 0.1% of the population, include Islam, Judaism, Hinduism, and Buddhism.

According to 2018 statistics assembled by Statistics Poland, 93.5% of the population is affiliated with a religion; 3.1% do not belong to any religion. The most practiced religion was Roman Catholicism, whose followers comprised the 91.9% of the population, followed by the Eastern Orthodox with 0.9% (rising from 0.4% in 2011, caused in part by recent immigration from Ukraine), Jehovah's Witnesses with 0.2%, and various Protestant denominations comprising 0.3% of the Polish population and 0.1 of Greek Catholic Churches. In 2015, 61.1% of the population gave religion high to very high importance whilst 13.8% regarded religion as of little or no importance. The percentage of believers is much higher in the eastern parts of Poland.

History
For centuries the ancient West Slavic and Lechitic peoples inhabiting the lands of modern-day Poland have practiced various forms of paganism known as Rodzimowierstwo (“native faith”). From the beginning of its statehood, different religions coexisted in Poland. With the baptism of Poland in 966, the old pagan religions were gradually eradicated over the next few centuries during the Christianization of Poland. However, this did not put an end to pagan beliefs in the country. The persistence was demonstrated by a series of rebellions known as the Pagan reaction in the first half of the 11th century, which also showed elements of a peasant uprising against landowners and feudalism, and led to a mutiny that destabilized the country. By the 13th century Catholicism had become the dominant religion throughout the country. Nevertheless, Christian Poles coexisted with a significant Jewish segment of the population.

In the 15th century, the Hussite Wars and the pressure from the papacy led to religious tensions between Catholics and the emergent Hussite and subsequent Protestant community, particularly after the Edict of Wieluń (1424). The Protestant movement gained a significant following in Poland and, though Roman Catholicism retained a dominant position within the state, the liberal Warsaw Confederation (1573) guaranteed wide religious tolerance. But the reactionary movement succeeded in reducing the scope for tolerance by the late 17th and early 18th century – as evidenced by events such as the Tumult of Toruń (1724).

When Poland was divided between its neighbors in the late eighteenth century, some Poles were subjected to religious discrimination in the newly expanded German Prussia and Russia.

Prior to the Second World War, some 3,500,000 Polish Jews (about 10% of the national population) lived in the Polish Second Republic, largely in cities. Between the Germano-Soviet invasions of Poland and the end of World War II, over 90% of Jews in Poland perished. The Holocaust (called the "Shoah" in Hebrew) took the lives of more than three million mostly Ashkenazi Jews in Poland. Comparatively few managed to survive the German occupation or to escape eastward into the territories of Poland annexed by the Soviet Union, beyond the reach of the Nazi Germany. As elsewhere in Europe during the interwar period, there was both official and popular anti-Semitism in Poland, at times encouraged by the Roman Catholic Church and by some political parties (particularly the right-wing endecja and small ONR groups and factions), but not directly by the Polish government itself.

According to a 2011 survey by Ipsos MORI, 85% of the Poles remain Christians; 8% are irreligious, atheist, or agnostic; 2% adhere to unspecified other religions; and 5% did not answer the question.

The Polish Constitution and religion 

The Polish Constitution assures freedom of religion for all. The Constitution also grants national and ethnic minorities the rights to establish educational and cultural institutions and institutions designed to protect religious identity, as well as to participate in the resolution of matters connected with their cultural identities.

Religious organizations in the Republic of Poland can register their institution with the Ministry of Interior and Administration, creating a record of churches and other religious organizations which operate under separate Polish laws. This registration is not necessary, but it does serve the laws guaranteeing freedom of religious practice.

Slavic Rodzimowiercy groups registered with the Polish authorities in 1995 are the Native Polish Church (Rodzimy Kościół Polski), which represents a pagan tradition which goes back to pre-Christian faiths and continues Władysław Kołodziej's 1921 Holy Circle of Worshipper of Światowid (Święte Koło Czcicieli Światowida), and the Polish Slavic Church (Polski Kościół Słowiański). This native Slavic religion is promoted also by the Native Faith Association (Zrzeszenie Rodzimej Wiary, ZRW), and the Association for Tradition founded in 2015.

Major denominations 
Around 125 faith groups and minor religions are registered in Poland. Data for 2018 provided by Główny Urząd Statystyczny, Poland's Central Statistical Office.

2015 poll by CBOS 
According to an opinion poll conducted in "a representative group of 1,000 people" by the Centre for Public Opinion Research (CBOS), published in 2015, 39% of Poles claim they are "believers following the Church's laws", while 52% answered that they are "believers in their own understanding and way", and 5% stated that they are atheists.

Selected locations

See also

 The Most Holy Virgin Mary, Queen of Poland
 Roman Catholicism in Poland
 Eastern Orthodoxy in Poland
 Protestantism in Poland
 Islam in Poland
 Buddhism in Poland
 Hinduism in Poland
 History of the Jews in Poland
 Bahá'í Faith in Poland
 Polish anti-religious campaign (1945–1990)
 Irreligion in Poland

Notes

References

External links
List of churches and religious unions registered according to special legislation
List of churches and religious unions from the Register of the Ministry of Internal Affairs and Administration
 Institute for Catholic Church Statistics